Alçalı (also, Alchaly) is a village and municipality in the Salyan Rayon of Azerbaijan.  It has a population of 600.

References 

Populated places in Salyan District (Azerbaijan)